The Rue Paul-Escudier is a street that passes through the 9th arrondissement of Paris, France.

Situation and access 
The street Paul-Escudier was formerly called 'cité Gaillard' and is now a public street in the 9th arrondissement of Paris starting at number 56 rue Blanche and ending at number 9 rue Henner.

Origin of the name 
The name of the street comes from the French politician Paul Escsudier (1858–1931) who was deputy of the arrondissement as well as councilor of the district.

History 
Originally, the street was built under the name of 'cité Gaillard', as it was on the lands of Mr. Gaillard, who was an entrepreneur in masonry. During that period, the street was closed by grids at its ends, before becoming a public street later in 1903, as it was named 'Rue Gaillard'. The current name of the street was decided by the decree of May 10, 1933.

The French painter Paul Jourdy (1805–1856) lived in the street.

References

External links

Streets in the 9th arrondissement of Paris